George Wathen may refer to:

 George Wathen (actor) (1762–1849), English actor, stage manager and theatre owner
 George Henry Wathen (1816–1879), geologist, author, magazine publisher and South African politician